Askern is a town and civil parish within the City of Doncaster, in South Yorkshire, England. It is on the A19 road between Doncaster and Selby. Historically part of the West Riding of Yorkshire, it had a population of 5,570 at the 2011 Census. Askern is also known in for its Greyhound Stadium.

History
The town's name derives from the Old English askr-ærn meaning 'building made of ash' or 'building surrounded by ash trees'.

The history of Askern can be traced back to the reign of Edward III. The people of Norton complained to the Sheriff of Osgoldcross that the people of Askern had failed to keep part of Askern Pool in a clean state. As a result, the King's highway had been "overflowed and drowned so that neither horse nor foot passengers could use it".

The parish church of St Peter's dates back to 1853.

Coal mining
Then in the early years of the 20th century the quest for coal identified a good seam of coal near Askern. It was decided to access the coal from a mine built above the town, and with the mine came the people to build it. As the mine opened the new houses were built for the workers and their families in the town. This new population was at odds with the well-to-do visitors. As the First World War started, the death knell was sounded for Askern Spa and the spa visitors declined to no more than a few regulars.

Railway 
Askern is on the former Lancashire and Yorkshire Railway line between Doncaster and Wakefield Kirkgate, though Askern railway station closed in 1947 and little remains of it. The line is used mainly by goods services, including coal to Ferrybridge, Eggbrough and Drax power stations, as well as the four-times daily Grand Central passenger services from Bradford Interchange to London King's Cross.

Bus services 

Askern is served by bus service 51 to Doncaster, Carcroft, Skellow and Norton. There are also two school bus services from the town.

See also
List of Yorkshire pits

References

Askern
Towns in South Yorkshire
Geography of the Metropolitan Borough of Doncaster
Civil parishes in South Yorkshire
Mining communities in England